Charles Novi (June 30, 1887 – April 1966) was an American art director. He was nominated an Academy Award in the category Best Art Direction for the film The Desert Song.

Selected filmography
 Law of the Tropics (1941)
 The Desert Song (1943)

References

External links

American art directors
1887 births
1966 deaths
Italian emigrants to the United States